The 1980–81 Connecticut Huskies men's basketball team represented the University of Connecticut in the 1980–81 collegiate men's basketball season. The Huskies completed the season with a 20–9 overall record. The Huskies were members of the Big East Conference where they finished with an 8–6 record. They made it to the second round of the 1981 National Invitation Tournament. The Huskies played their home games at Hugh S. Greer Field House in Storrs, Connecticut, the New Haven Coliseum in New Haven, Connecticut, and the Hartford Civic Center in Hartford, Connecticut and were led by fourth-year head coach Dom Perno.

Schedule 

|-
!colspan=12 style=""| Regular Season

|-
!colspan=12 style=""| Big East tournament

|-
!colspan=12 style=""| NIT

Schedule Source:

References 

UConn Huskies men's basketball seasons
Connecticut Huskies
Connecticut
Connecticut Huskies
Connecticut Huskies